The March 23 Movement, often abbreviated as M23 and also known as the Congolese Revolutionary Army (Armée révolutionnaire du Congo), is a rebel military group that is for the most part formed of ethnic Tutsi. Based in eastern areas of the Democratic Republic of the Congo (DRC), it operates mainly in the province of North Kivu. The M23 rebellion of 2012 to 2013 against the DRC government led to the displacement of large numbers of people. On 20 November 2012, M23 took control of Goma, a provincial capital with a population of a million people, but it was requested to evacuate it by the International Conference on the Great Lakes Region because the DRC government had finally agreed to negotiate. In late 2012, Congolese troops, along with UN troops, retook control of Goma, and M23 announced a ceasefire and said that it wanted to resume peace talks.

A United Nations report found that Rwanda created and commanded the M23 rebel group. Rwanda ceased its support because of international pressure and the military defeat by the DRC and the UN in 2013.

In 2017, M23 elements resumed their insurgency in the DRC, but the operations of this splinter faction had little local impact.

In October 2022, the group launched its latest offensive in the east of DRC, which forced thousands to escape. In 2022, a larger portion of M23 started an offensive, which eventually resulted in the capture of the Congolese border town of Bunagana by the rebels. After the M23 attacks of 2022, the Congolese government blamed Rwanda and accused President Paul Kagame's government of supporting the rebels. Rwanda denied these accusations. In November 2022, M23 rebels got close to the city of Goma and forced about 180,000 people to leave their homes after the Congolese Army had withdrawn from the region near the village of Kibumba. As of February 2023 the group occupies various major towns in eastern North Kivu including Bunagana, Kiwanja,  Kitshanga, Rubaya, Rutshuru, and controls vital roads leading to Goma.

Background

On 23 March 2009, the National Congress for the Defence of the People (CNDP) signed a peace treaty with the DRC government, where it became a political party, and the M23 soldiers integrated into the Armed Forces of the Democratic Republic of the Congo (FARDC).  M23 takes its name from the date of these peace accords.  The armed wing of the group is led by General Makenga Sultani, who has served as acting president of the group since the 28 February 2013 removal of Bishop Jean-Marie Runiga Lugerero, a former CNDP member.

Operations

Formation
The M23 was formed on 4 April 2012 when nearly 300 soldiers - the majority of them former members of the National Congress for the Defence of the People (CNDP) - turned against the DRC government, citing poor conditions in the army and the government's unwillingness to implement the 23 March 2009 peace deal. General Bosco Ntaganda, also known as "The Terminator", was accused by the Government of Kinshasa of leading the group, and President Kabila called for his arrest on 11 April 2012. The government had threatened to redeploy former CNDP soldiers away from North Kivu before the full implementation of the peace agreement, which prompted many of them to defect from the army and create the M23.

The M23 is made up primarily of Tutsis and opposes the Hutu Power militia Democratic Forces for the Liberation of Rwanda (a group that counts among its number the original members of the Interahamwe that carried out the 1994 Rwandan Genocide) as well as area Mai-Mai (community militias mostly created and supported by the Democratic Republic of Congo). To be able to upstaff the troops, occupied villages were asked to deliver youngsters for the formation of village defence committees. This way, a larger number of more experienced soldiers could be stationed on the battlefield. However, this approach backfired when M23 troops tried to extort from the local population, since the armed youngsters defended their own villagers.

Following military successes, M23 rebels made additional demands, citing issues of human rights, democracy, as well as good governance. They have accused President Kabila of cheating in the November 2011 elections. The rebels have threatened to march on Kinshasa and depose the president.

Mutiny

The rebels were active in North Kivu province, fighting government forces in the Rutshuru and Masisi territories. On 6 June 2012 a Congolese spokesman reported that 200 M23 soldiers had died in the mutiny and that over 370 soldiers had surrendered to FARDC, including 25 Rwandan citizens. On 8 July 2012, Colonel Sultani Makenga announced that a government offensive to dislodge the group from their hideouts had failed, and that they had in turn captured several towns towards Goma, the provincial capital.

Late 2012 offensive

March 23 Movement forces had advanced to the outskirts of Goma by 18 November 2012 and warned the UN peacekeepers (MONUSCO) not to support government troops. Congolese government spokesman Lambert Mende accused Rwanda of backing the rebels. "The DRC has "not yet declared war, but we are ready to face it. This is our country, our duty".

M23 rebels advanced on Goma 20 November, and the Congolese Army retreated with little fighting. M23 forces paraded through the city, and some residents turned out to welcome them. Congolese customs officers abandoned their posts, leaving the border to Rwanda open. United Nations peacekeepers watched the occupation without intervening, stating that their mandate was limited to protecting the safety of civilians.
Jeune Afrique later reported that M23 rebels acquired as well as six artillery pieces (type 26 and BM-type rocket launchers)approximately ~20 shipping containers filled with arms and ammunitions of various caliber, all of which were abandoned by the FARDC during their retreat from Goma.

DR Congo president Joseph Kabila urged Goma's citizens to "resist" the M23 takeover. UN Secretary General Ban Ki-moon criticized the M23 for alleged human rights violations during the takeover, including "intimidation of journalists", and abduction of women and children. Noting that the First Congo War had begun with fighting in the same region, the New York Times described the takeover of Goma as "raising serious questions about the stability of Congo as a whole".

On 21 November 2012, during the siege more than 2,000 Congolese soldiers and 700 policemen defected to M23.

On 22 November, the FARDC, in cooperation with local Mai-Mai elements, routed the M23 rebels from the nearby town of Sake, 27 kilometers from Goma, as they marched towards Bukavu. Also 22 November, Kabila suspended General Gabriel Amisi's FARDC commission because of an inquiry into his alleged role in arms sales to various rebel groups, including the FDLR, in the eastern part of the country, so it implicated M23. On 23 November, M23 rebels retook Sake from the FARDC after an intense four-hour battle and reinforced their position in the town, as they reportedly moved toward Kirotshe to the south, Mushaki to the north-west, and Kingi to the north. Meanwhile, the FARDC reinforced their position in Minova, near the South Kivu provincial border, with more than 3500 soldiers. The UN has declared that it lost access to 30 of its 31 refugee camps in the area due to the M23 offensive.

On 24 November in South Kivu, Colonel Albert Kahasha, who had surrendered and joined government troops along with other leaders of Mai-Mai militia groups Raïa Mutomboki and Nyatura. On 13 November he defected again from the FARDC. At a regional meeting in Kampala, leaders of the Great Lakes area gave M23 a two-day ultimatum to leave Goma. A combined force which would include international troops, a FARDC company, and a M23 company would be posted near Goma Airport and would take charge of security. When the ultimatum expired on 26 November, M23 still controlled the city.

The FARDC, had previously withdrawn after raping almost 126 women, some of them less than 10 years old, according to the United Nations and looting the money and possessions of the local population, came from Minova in a counteroffensive launched against M23 positions in the Masisi, North Kivu region on 27 November. M23 set up a road block on the road from Goma to Sake and reportedly extorted funds from drivers.

Following a peace deal negotiated in Uganda, the M23 said it would withdraw from Goma by 1 December. On 30 November, M23 troops began to withdraw from Sake and Masisi. A first contingent of 200 police officers also arrived in Goma on 30 November, in anticipation of M23's withdrawal. M23 operatives allegedly kept a presence there, dressed in civilian police uniforms. On the eve of the withdrawal, FARDC forces accused M23 rebels of going door to door in some of Goma's suburbs on the eve of their withdrawal, looting personal possessions, money and vehicles. The political wing of the movement denied this accusation, and said that criminal elements who had escaped from Munzenze prison were responsible for the looting.

On 3 December 2012, FARDC and Congolese government officials re-enter Goma, two days after M23 left the city.

On 24 February 2013, leaders of eleven African nations signed an agreement designed to bring peace to the eastern region of the Democratic Republic of Congo, among them Rwanda and Uganda. Both had been accused of aiding the M23 rebellion, a charge they denied. M23 was not represented either in the negotiations, or at the signing.

On 18 March 2013, Bosco Ntaganda handed himself in to the U.S. embassy in Kigali, Rwanda, where he requested transfer to the International Criminal Court in The Hague, Netherlands. Though the reasons for his surrender are unknown it was speculated that he was either pressured to do so by Rwanda or feared infighting within the M23 movement and its military leader Sulani Makenga, which had recently forced Ntaganda's forces to flee the DRC into Rwanda. Though Rwanda was not a signatory to the Rome Statute, the media speculated it would be forced to turn him over to the ICC. The U.S. also had listed him on its Rewards for Justice Program. On 22 March, he was detained by the ICC and appeared for the first time in front of the ICC on 26 March, to which he denied charges of rape, murder, and other offenses.

End of the first rebellion

In March 2013, the United Nations Security Council authorized the deployment of an intervention brigade within MONUSCO to carry out targeted offensive operations, with or without the Congolese national army, against armed groups that threaten peace in eastern DRC. The brigade is based in North Kivu and is made up of a total of 3,069 peacekeepers. It is tasked with neutralizing armed groups, reducing the threat posed to State authority and civilian security and make space for stabilization activities. The FIB alongside the Government Forces (FARDC) engaged the M23 in July 2013, August 2013 and September to October 2013.

On 6 November 2013 government forces launched an assault on M23 rebel position in the east of the country. This occurred one day after insurgents called for a ceasefire. The following day M23 issued a document that said they had "decided from this day to end its rebellion" and instead to pursue its goals "through purely political means". On 7 November, Sultani Makenga, the leader of M23, surrendered with about 1,500 M23 fighters in Mgahinga National Park, Uganda. They were eventually moved to refugee camps in Uganda.

After peace declarations were signed between the DRC Government and M23 rebels on 12 December 2013, issues of legal accountability for the rebellion remain because of international pressure.

Resurgence

In 2017, M23 commander Sultani Makenga and about 100 to 200 of his followers fled from Uganda to resume their insurgency, setting up camp at Mount Mikeno in the border area between Rwanda, Uganda, and the DR Congo. The operations of this splinter group remained marginal, and were not supported by the rest of M23. In March 2022, Makenga's group launched an offensive from their remote bases; these first attacks achieved little. After failed peace talks in April 2022, however, the M23 faction of Bisimwa joined the offensive. In May 2022, M23 fighters launched their most sustained attack since the start of their new offensive, overrunning a Congolese army base at Rumangabo. On 13 June, the rebels captured the important border town of Bunagana.

On 20th October 2022 the group launched its latest offensive in the east of DRC forcing thousends to escape. After the M23 attacks of 2022, the Congolese government blamed Rwanda, and accused President Paul Kagame's government of supporting the rebels, charges which Kigali denied. In November 2022 M23 rebels got close to the city of Goma, forcing about 180,000 people to leave their homes after the Congolese army withdrew from the region close to the village of Kibumba.

On Friday 25th November 2022, M23 agreed on a ceasefire.

Internal conflicts
On 25 February 2013, disagreement between factions of the M23 about how to react to the peace agreement led to violence. M23's political leader, Jean-Marie Runiga Lugerero, was sacked. In a statement signed by M23's military leader, Sultani Makenga, he was accused of treason because of "financial embezzlement, divisions, ethnic hatred, deceit and political immaturity". Makenga declared himself interim leader and clashes between those loyal to Sultani Makenga and those loyal to Jean-Marie Runiga Lugerero, who is allied with Bosco Ntaganda,  have killed ten men and two others were hospitalized. M23 has denied that it is hit by dissent.

By 2022, M23 was splint into factions loyal to Bertrand Bisimwa, Jean-Marie Runiga, and Sultani Makenga.

References

Works cited

Further reading

External links

UN Group of Experts final report 2012
Full text of the Agenda for the Dialogue between the Government of the DRC and the M23 on the situation in Eastern Congo, 16 January 2013, UN Peacemaker

March 23 Movement
2012 establishments in the Democratic Republic of the Congo
Military units and formations established in 2012
North Kivu
Rebel groups in the Democratic Republic of the Congo